Taseopteryx is a monotypic moth genus of the family Noctuidae. Its only species, Taseopteryx sericea, is found in Chile. Both the genus and species were first described by Arthur Gardiner Butler in 1883.

References

Acontiinae
Monotypic moth genera
Endemic fauna of Chile